Thomas E. Shenk is the James A. Elkins Jr. Professor in the Life Sciences in the department of Molecular Biology at Princeton University. Although his publications have contributed to the fields of biochemistry, cell biology, genetics, genomics, microbiology and virology, his present research interest involves the cytomegalovirus.  Aside from academic involvement, Dr. Shenk has sat on the board of directors of Merck & Co. and the Fox Chase Cancer Center.

Career
Shenk received a BS in biology from the University of Detroit, and earned a Ph.D. in Microbiology from Rutgers University.

Shank received in 1982 the Eli Lilly and Company-Elanco Research Award from the American Society for Microbiology. He was elected to the National Academy of Sciences in 1996, and the American Academy of Arts and Sciences in 2002. He served as a Howard Hughes Medical Institute investigator from 1998 to 1999.

In 2021, Shenk transferred to Emeritus status within the Princeton department of Molecular Biology.

References

External links
Current research at Princeton University
Faculty profile at Princeton University

21st-century American biochemists
Living people
Members of the United States National Academy of Sciences
Year of birth missing (living people)
Journal of Virology editors
Members of the National Academy of Medicine